DeAngelo Tyson (born April 12, 1989) is a former American football defensive end. He was selected in the seventh round, 236th overall, by the Baltimore Ravens in the 2012 NFL Draft. He played college football at Georgia.

Early life and high school 
Tyson was born in Savannah, Georgia on April 12, 1989. During his childhood, Tyson lived in a home where his father wasn't around and his mother was abusive. When Tyson was 10 years old, his mother beat him badly enough that neighbors called for help. Tyson moved out of his mother's home and transferred to the Joseph Home for Boys, an affiliate of The Department of Family and Children Services. He lived in DFCS care until he completed middle school. Tyson attended Statesboro High School in Statesboro, Georgia, where he was teammates with Justin Houston. In his sophomore year, he was a member of 2005 AAAA state champion team. As a senior, he registered 54 tackles, 14 for loss, and nine sacks, and was a 2007 USA Today high school All-USA selection. He picked Georgia over Tennessee, South Carolina, North Carolina State, Auburn, and Florida.

College career
He played college football at Georgia under head coach Mark Richt.

Professional career

2012 NFL Draft
Projected as a 6th–7th round selection, Tyson was listed as the No. 22 defensive tackle available in the 2012 NFL Draft. Sports Illustrated described him as "tough college defensive lineman", who, however, "lacks great athleticism and upside for the next level."

Baltimore Ravens
He was drafted in the seventh round with the 236th overall selection by the Baltimore Ravens in the 2012 NFL Draft. Tyson recorded his first career interception versus the Detroit Lions in Week 15 of the 2013 season. On September 5, 2015, he was waived-injured by the Ravens. On September 7, 2015, Tyson was released by the Ravens with an injury settlement.

Seattle Seahawks
He was signed by the Seattle Seahawks to a reserve/futures contract on January 19, 2016. On August 29, 2016, he was waived by the Seahawks.

References

External links
 
 Baltimore Ravens bio
 Georgia Bulldogs bio
 The Tyson Foundation

1989 births
Living people
American football defensive ends
American football defensive tackles
Georgia Bulldogs football players
Baltimore Ravens players
Seattle Seahawks players
People from Statesboro, Georgia
Players of American football from Georgia (U.S. state)
African-American players of American football
21st-century African-American sportspeople
20th-century African-American people